1st World Soundtrack Awards
October 18, 2001

Best Original Soundtrack:
 Le fabuleux destind'Amélie Poulain
The 1st World Soundtrack Awards were given on 18 October 2001 in Ghent, Belgium.

Winners
Soundtrack Composer of the Year:
A.I.: Artificial Intelligence – John Williams
Best Original Soundtrack of the Year:
Le fabuleux destin d'Amélie Poulain (Amélie) – Yann Tiersen
Best Original Score of the Year Not Released on an Album:
Bridget Jones's Diary – Patrick Doyle
Best Original Song Written for a Film:
"Come What May" – Moulin Rouge!
Composed by David Baerwald
Most Creative Use of Existing Material on a Soundtrack:
Moulin Rouge! – Baz Luhrmann, Craig Armstrong and Marius De Vries
Public Choice Award:
A.I.: Artificial Intelligence – John Williams
Discovery of the Year:
Craig Armstrong – Moulin Rouge!
Lifetime Achievement Award:
Elmer Bernstein

References

External links 

0